Centranthus ruber, the red valerian, spur valerian, kiss-me-quick, fox's brush, devil's beard or Jupiter's beard, is a popular garden plant grown for its ornamental flowers.

Description

It grows as a perennial plant, usually as a subshrub though it can take any form from a herbaceous plant to a shrub depending on conditions; the plants are usually woody at the base. The leaves are generally 5–8 cm in length.  Their form changes from the bottom to the top of the plant, the lower leaves being petiolate while the upper leaves are sessile. The leaves grow in opposite pairs and are oval or lanceolate in shape. The plant flowers profusely, and though the individual flowers are small (no more than 2 mm), the inflorescences are large and showy.  The flowers are small in rounded clusters each with 5 fused petals and a spur. The most typical color is a brick red or purplish red, but colors include deep crimson, pale pink, and lavender.  Centranthus ruber 'Albus' (about 10% of individuals) has white blooms. Flowering takes place in early summer and, in cool summer areas, continues sporadically throughout the summer and into fall. The cultivar 'coccineus' is especially long-blooming. The blooms have a strong and somewhat rank scent. They are pollinated by both bees and butterflies and the plant is noted for attracting insects. It is used as a food plant by the larvae of some Lepidoptera species including angle shades. Seeds have tufts similar to dandelions that allow wind dispersal, and as such can self-seed freely and become invasive if not properly controlled.

Distribution

A native of the Mediterranean region, Centranthus ruber has been introduced into many other parts of the world as a garden escape. It is naturalised in France, Australia, Great Britain, Ireland, Isle of Man and the United States. In the US it can be found growing wild in such western states as Arizona, Utah, California, Hawaii, Washington, and Oregon, usually in disturbed, rocky places at elevations below 200 m. It is often seen by roadsides or in urban wasteland. It can tolerate very alkaline soil conditions.  Because it can tolerate the lime in mortar, Centranthus ruber may frequently be seen growing in old walls in Italy, southern France and south-west UK.

Invasive species
It is listed as a NEMBA 1b invasive in the Western Cape, South Africa. It may not be owned, imported, grown, moved, sold, given as a gift or dumped in a waterway. It requires compulsory control as part of an invasive species control programme to remove and destroy. The plants are deemed to have such a high invasive potential that infestations can qualify to be placed under a government sponsored invasive species management programme. No permits will be issued.

References

External links

 Jepson Manual species treatment
 Entry in the Plants for a Future database
 Images from the CalPhotos archive

Edible plants
Garden plants of Europe
ruber
Flora of Malta